Texas vs The Nation was an American college football all-star bowl game played from 2007 to 2013. Originally played at the Sun Bowl Stadium, the format of the game pitted 50 top-rated college seniors who played college or high school football in Texas against a squad of 50 top-rated seniors from the other 49 states. In its first year, 73% of players who participated in the game were signed by National Football League (NFL) teams. In 2011, the game moved from El Paso to San Antonio, and the National Football League Players Association (NFLPA) became the named sponsor of the game.  In 2012, the NFLPA began its own all-star game, the NFLPA Collegiate Bowl, and the Texas vs The Nation game was not held. The game was revived in 2013 at Eagle Stadium in Allen, but did not return in 2014.

Game results

Game MVPs

References

External links
 via Wayback Machine
 YouTube channel

American football in the Dallas–Fort Worth metroplex
American football in El Paso, Texas
American football competitions in San Antonio
College football all-star games
Recurring sporting events established in 2007
Recurring sporting events disestablished in 2013